Jeffries Glacier is a glacier between Lenton Bluff and the Maro Cliffs, flowing northwest for at least  through the Theron Mountains of Antarctica. It was first mapped in 1956–57 by the Commonwealth Trans-Antarctic Expedition and named for Peter H. Jeffries, a meteorologist with the advance party of the expedition in 1955–56.

See also
 List of glaciers in the Antarctic
 Glaciology

References

Glaciers of Coats Land